Ehrich is a surname. It may refer to:

August Ehrich (1883–?), German gymnast and Olympics competitor
Elsa Ehrich (1914–1948), German Nazi SS concentration camp guard executed for war crimes
Emil Ehrich (died 1887), German metalworker and businessman; co-founder of Ehrich & Graetz
Hans Ehrich (born 1942), Swedish industrial designer and businessman
Jochen H.H. Ehrich (born 1946), German pediatrician, tropical physician, nephrologist, and professor
Louis R. Ehrich (1849–1911), American businessman, art dealer, and politician
Maria Ehrich (born 1993), German actress
Max Ehrich (born 1991), American actor, singer, and dancer
William Ernst Ehrich (1897–1960), German-born American sculptor, ceramicist, educator, and WPA supervisor

See also
Ehrlich (disambiguation), a similarly spelled surname
Harry Houdini ( Ehrich Weiss, among other names; 1874–1926), Hungarian-born American illusionist and stunt performer

Surnames from given names